Primera División A (Méxican First A Division) is a Mexican football tournament. This season was composed of Invieno 2000 and Verano 2001. Reboceros de La Piedad was the winner of the promotion to First Division after winning Gallos de Aguascalientes in the promotion playoff.

Changes for the 2000–01 season
The Jaguares de Colima spot in Primera 'A' was bought by Halcones de Querétaro, Halcones remained in the league, Jaguares had dissolved.
Toros Neza was relegated from Primera Division.
Potros Marte was promoted from Second Division.

Stadiums and locations

Invierno 2000

Group league tables

Group 1

Group 2

Group 3

Group 4

General league table

Results

Reclassification series

First leg

Second leg

Liguilla

Quarter-finals

First leg

Second leg

Semi-finals

First leg

Second leg

Final

First leg

Second leg

Verano 2001

Changes for Verano 2001
Ángeles de Puebla was acquired by the Universidad Cuauhtémoc and its name was changed to Real San Sebastián.

Group league tables

Group 1

Group 2

Group 3

Group 4

General league table

Results

Reclassification series

First leg

Second leg

Liguilla

Quarter-finals

First leg

Second leg

Semi-finals

First leg

Second leg

Final

First leg

Second leg

Top scorers

Relegation table

Promotion final
The Promotion Final faced Gallos de Aguascalientes against Reboceros de La Piedad to determine the winner of the First Division Promotion.

First leg

Second leg

First division promotion playoff
The Mexican Football Federation decided to increase the number of teams in the Primera División to 19 participants, so it was decided to play a promotion series between Atlante, the last place in the Primera División relegation table, and Veracruz, which was the team with most points in the Primera A season. Finally, Atlante was the winner and remained in Primera División.

First leg

Second leg

Relegation playoff
A relegation series faced Halcones de Querétaro, last team in the Primera A relegation table, against Potros Zitácuaro, champion of the Second Division.

First leg

Second leg

References

2000–01 in Mexican football
Mexico
Mexico
Ascenso MX seasons